"Caterina" is a song originally recorded and released by Perry Como. It reached number 23 in the United States, number 37 in the UK and was also a hit in numerous other countries.

Writing and release 
The song was written by Earl Shuman and Maurice "Bugs" Bower.

It was originally released by Como in 1962 as a single, coupled with "The Island of Forgotten Lovers".

Track listing

Charts

References 

1962 songs
1962 singles
RCA Victor singles
Perry Como songs
Songs with lyrics by Earl Shuman